Athule Kotta (born 26 August 1995) is a South African cricketer. He made his List A debut on 17 November 2019, for Border in the 2019–20 CSA Provincial One-Day Challenge.

See also
 List of Border representative cricketers

References

External links
 

1995 births
Living people
South African cricketers
Border cricketers
Cricketers from Port Elizabeth